Weckert is a surname. Notable people with this surname include:

 John Weckert, Australian philosopher
 Joseph Francis of Weckert (1822–1889), German bishop
 Noel and Sophia Weckert, Australian murder victims
 Werner Weckert (born 1938), Swiss cyclist

See also
 Wecker (surname)